Eleanor Laura Davan Mills (née Woodward; born 31 May 1991) is a British food writer and businesswoman, best known for the 'Deliciously Ella' food blog and brand.

Early life and family
Woodward was born on 31 May 1991 in Rugby, Warwickshire, England, the daughter of the politician Shaun Woodward and his wife Camilla, daughter of politician Tim Sainsbury and granddaughter of Lord Sainsbury, of the Sainsbury's supermarket owning family.

After attending Rugby School, she graduated with a degree in history of art from the University of St Andrews in 2013.

In April 2016 she married Tessa Jowell's son, Matthew Mills, who is also her business partner. The couple have two daughters, Skye, who was born in July 2019  and May, born in October 2020.

Career
Woodward writes about food in a blog she founded in 2012 named Deliciously Ella which was also the title of her first book, published in 2015. Her second book, Deliciously Ella Every Day was released in January 2016. A third book, Deliciously Ella With Friends was released in January 2017. She was an advocate of clean eating but turned against it after a media backlash that questioned its health benefits. Her clean eating series of books was called by The Guardian "arguably the most successful fad diet cookbook series in recent years".

In 2014, the Deliciously Ella App was launched containing over 100 recipes. The app with plant-based recipes, yoga videos and guided meditations is available in the App Store and Google Play.

In 2015, Ella and her business partner, Matthew Mills, opened The MaE Deli, Seymour Place, Marylebone. In 2016 they opened their second site, The MaE Deli, Weighhouse Street, Mayfair. In early 2017, a third site was launched named The Kitchen Counter, in Herne Hill, as an extension to their development kitchen. In March 2018, after less than a year, the Herne Hill site was closed down, as was the Marylebone deli, due to debts accruing of £720,000.

The Deliciously Ella brand also includes food products sold in stores. These products started with energy balls and eventually expanded to more than 30 products. They expanded to the United States in 2019.

Books
Deliciously Ella: Awesome ingredients, incredible food that you and your body will love''' Hodder and Stoughton, London, 2015. Deliciously Ella Every Day. Hodder and Stoughton, London, 2016. Deliciously Ella: Smoothies & Juices: Bite-size Collection. Sept 2016 Deliciously Ella With Friends. Hodder and Stoughton, London, 2017. Deliciously Ella: The Plant-Based Cookbook Aug 2018 Deliciously Ella: Quick & Easy Cookbook'' July 2020

References

External links

1991 births
Alumni of the University of St Andrews
British women bloggers
Clean eating advocates
English bloggers
English food writers
English people of Dutch-Jewish descent
Living people
People educated at Rugby School
People from Rugby, Warwickshire
Plant-based diet advocates
Pseudoscientific diet advocates
Sainsbury family
Vegetarian cookbook writers
Women food writers